The long-tailed tyrant (Colonia colonus) is a species of bird in the family Tyrannidae, the only member of genus Colonia.

It is found in Argentina, Bolivia, Brazil, Colombia, Costa Rica, Ecuador, French Guiana, Guyana, Honduras, Nicaragua, Panama, Paraguay, Peru, Suriname, and Venezuela.
Its natural habitats are subtropical or tropical moist lowland forest, subtropical or tropical moist montane forest, and heavily degraded former forest.

References

Further reading

long-tailed tyrant
Birds of Nicaragua
Birds of Costa Rica
Birds of Panama
Birds of South America
long-tailed tyrant
Taxa named by Louis Jean Pierre Vieillot
Taxonomy articles created by Polbot